Jannat Makan Rural District is a rural district (dehestan) in the Central District of Gotvand County, Khuzestan Province, Iran. At the 2006 census, its population (including Jannat Makan, which has since been promoted to city status and detached from the rural district) was 16,029, in 2,999 families; excluding Jannat Makan, the population (as of 2006) was 10,136, in 1,913 families.  The rural district has 7 villages.

References 

Rural Districts of Khuzestan Province
Gotvand County